Guo Wei (born 2 July 1982) is a Chinese Paralympic athlete competing mainly in category F35 field events.

Biography
Guo is a six time Paralympic gold medalist.  He competed in the 2004 Summer Paralympics in Athens, Greece where he won the F35 javelin, shot put and the F36-38 long jump.  He continued this trend in Beijing, China at the 2008 Summer Paralympics with a clean sweep of the throwing gold medals in the F35/36 class.

He holds F35 world records in long jump, shot put, discus and javelin.

Reference list

External links
 

1982 births
Living people
Athletes from Shanghai
Chinese male long jumpers
Chinese male shot putters
Chinese male discus throwers
Chinese male javelin throwers
Paralympic athletes of China
Paralympic gold medalists for China
Athletes (track and field) at the 2004 Summer Paralympics
Athletes (track and field) at the 2008 Summer Paralympics
Medalists at the 2004 Summer Paralympics
Medalists at the 2008 Summer Paralympics
World record holders in Paralympic athletics
Paralympic medalists in athletics (track and field)
21st-century Chinese people
Paralympic shot putters
Paralympic long jumpers
Paralympic discus throwers
Paralympic javelin throwers
World Para Athletics Championships winners
Medalists at the World Para Athletics Championships
Medalists at the 2010 Asian Para Games